Mauro Jagodnich (born 11 July 1967) is an Italian rower. He competed in the men's double sculls event at the 1988 Summer Olympics.

References

1967 births
Living people
Italian male rowers
Olympic rowers of Italy
Rowers at the 1988 Summer Olympics
Place of birth missing (living people)